Gary Panter (born December 1, 1950) is an American cartoonist, illustrator, painter, designer and part-time musician. Panter's work is representative of the post-underground, new wave comics movement that began with the end of Arcade: The Comics Revue and the initiation of RAW, one of the second generation in American underground comix.

Panter has published his work in various magazines and newspapers, including Raw, Time and Rolling Stone magazine. He has exhibited widely, and won three Emmy awards for his set designs for Pee-wee's Playhouse. His most notable works include Jimbo, Adventures in Paradise, Jimbo's Inferno and Facetasm, which was created together with Charles Burns.

Biography 
Panter attended East Texas State University, now known as Texas A&M University-Commerce, where he studied under Jack Unruh and Lee Baxter Davis where he was one of The Lizard Cult. As an early participant in the Los Angeles punk scene in the 1970s, Panter defined the grungy style of the era with his drawings for Slash magazine and numerous record covers.

Some time around 1980, Panter's Rozz Tox Manifesto was published in the Ralph Records catalog, calling for artists to work within the capitalist system. He also worked on, with Jay Cotton, Pee-Dog: The Shit Generation for the Church of the SubGenius.

In the 1980s, he was the set designer for Pee-wee's Playhouse, where he won three Emmy Awards. Prior to Panter's work, children's shows had a more lulling aesthetic: everything was round, "cute", simplified, and pastel. The set of Pee-wee's Playhouse was the antithesis of pablum-art: it was dense as a jungle and jam-packed with surprises, often loud and abrasive ones.

While doing illustration and set designs, Panter kept up an active career as a cartoonist. His work in comics includes contributions to the avant-garde comics magazine RAW and the graphic novel Cola Madnes.

Panter also created the online series Pink Donkey for Cartoon Network.
 
He published Jimbo in Purgatory, and Jimbo's Inferno with Fantagraphics Books, lavishly produced graphic novels which incorporate classic literature elements (most prominently Dante's Divine Comedy) with pop and punk culture sensibilities.  

In 2008, PictureBox published Gary Panter, a two-volume 700-page comprehensive overview of his work, including never-before-published sketches.

In 2010, the French publishing company United Dead Artists, founded by Stéphane Blanquet, published two books on the work of Gary Panter: The Wrong Box and The Land Unknown.

Use by music artists 

Warner Bros. Records commissioned Panter to paint the album covers for the unauthorized releases of Frank Zappa's albums Studio Tan (1978), Sleep Dirt and Orchestral Favorites (1979).

In 2006, one of Panter's paintings was used as the cover art for Yo La Tengo's album I Am Not Afraid of You and I Will Beat Your Ass.

Personal life 
He is best friends with Matt Groening. From 1978 to 1986, Panter was married to writer Nicole Panter, who was the manager of the notorious Los Angeles punk rock band the Germs.

Style
Panter was influenced by, among others, Frank Zappa's art director Cal Schenkel. His comics are fast and hard and are drawn in an expressionistic manner. His works balance the worlds of painting, commercial art, illustration, cartoons, alternative comix, and music.  Panter undertakes all of his projects with imaginative punk flair.

Exhibitions 
With Winsor McCay, Lyonel Feininger, George Herriman, Elzie Segar, Frank King, Chester Gould, Milton Caniff, Charles Schulz, Will Eisner, Jack Kirby, Harvey Kurtzman, Robert Crumb, Art Spiegelman and Chris Ware, Panter was among the artists honored in the exhibition "Masters of American Comics" at the Jewish Museum in New York City, from September 16, 2006, to January 28, 2007.

An exhibition of originals of Gary Panter's drawings and paintings was shown at the Phoenix Art Museum in Phoenix, AZ from April 21 through August 19, 2007. An exhibition of paintings was at the Dunn and Brown Contemporary gallery in Dallas in October 2007.

Awards and honors
Panter was the recipient of the 2012 Klein Award, which is given by the Museum of Comic and Cartoon Art at their annual MoCCA Art Festival in New York.

Bibliography 
 Hup (self-published, 1977)
 The Asshole (self-published minicomic, 1979)
 Okupant X (Diana's Bimonthly Press, 1979)
 Raw One-Shot Edition #1: Jimbo (Raw Books, 1982)
 Dal Tokyo (Fantagraphics Books, 1983)
 Invasion of the Elvis Zombies (Raw Books, 1984)
 Jimbo: Adventures in Paradise (Pantheon Books, 1988)
 Jimbo #1–7 (Bongo Comics, 1995–1997)
 Cola Madness (Funny Garbage, 2001)
 100.1: Drawings by Gary Panter (Plywood Press, 2004)
 Jimbo in Purgatory (Fantagraphics, 2004)
 Satiro-Plastic: The Sketchbook of Gary Panter (Drawn and Quarterly, 2005)
 Jimbo's Inferno (Fantagraphics, 2006)
 Hey Dork!: The Sketchbook of Gary Panter (Drawn and Quarterly, 2007)
 The Land Unknown (Galerie Martel, 2009)
 Songy of Paradise (Fantagraphics, 2017)
 Crashpad (Fantagraphics, 2021)

Notes

References

 Gary Panter profile at Lambiek

External links
 
 
 
 
 

1950 births
Living people
People from Durant, Oklahoma
American graphic designers
American surrealist artists
American comics artists
American cartoonists
American essayists
American SubGenii
Alternative cartoonists
Album-cover and concert-poster artists
Artists from Oklahoma
American Book Award winners
Underground cartoonists
Inkpot Award winners
Texas A&M University–Commerce alumni